Short Island is an island lying 4.0 km (2.5 miles) southwest of Cape Page, close off the west coast of Graham Land. Shown on an Argentine government chart of 1952. Named by the United Kingdom Antarctic Place-Names Committee (UK-APC) in 1960 for Short Brothers, the British firm started by Eustace, Oswald and Horace Short, who in 1909 received an order from the famous Wright brothers to build six Wright Flyer aircraft, and thus Shorts earned the title of "the first aircraft factory in the world." This factory was at Muswell Manor at Leysdown on the Isle of Sheppey in Kent. 
Shorts, as they were known, later moved to Eastchurch, Cardington (airships), Rochester and Belfast. Belfast City Airport is now built on the Shorts runway. 
Their name lives on as Bombardier (Shorts), manufacturing midsection fuselages and engine nacelles. This is a long way from their Battersea railway arch where they built 6 observation balloons for the Indian Army at the end of the nineteenth century.

See also 
 List of Antarctic and sub-Antarctic islands
 Long Island

Islands of Graham Land
Davis Coast